A Question of Sport is a 1988 video game based on the BBC quiz show of the same name. As in the show, the player has to answer questions about sports. The game uses the same engine as Mike Read's Computer Pop Quiz.

External links

Reviews 
 Kultboy
 CVG
 CVG (second)
 CVG (third)
 Raze
 ST Format
 Ace
 Ace (second)
 TGM
 TGM (second)

1988 video games
Amiga games
Amstrad CPC games
Atari ST games
BBC Micro and Acorn Electron games
Commodore 64 games
Quiz video games
Sports mass media in the United Kingdom
Superior Software games
Video games based on game shows
ZX Spectrum games
Multiplayer and single-player video games
Video games scored by Mark Cooksey
Video games developed in the United Kingdom